Morning Glory is a 1933 American Pre-Code drama film which tells the story of an eager would-be actress and her journey to stardom, and her gains and losses. The picture stars Katharine Hepburn, Douglas Fairbanks Jr., and Adolphe Menjou, was adapted by Howard J. Green from a then-unproduced stage play of the same name by Zoë Akins, and was directed by Lowell Sherman. Hepburn won her first Academy Award for Best Actress for this movie. Morning Glory was remade in 1958 under the title Stage Struck.

Plot

Eva Lovelace (Katharine Hepburn) is a small-town performer who has dreamed since childhood of making it big on Broadway. She has gone to many auditions, but no one has given her a break yet. At the management office of the Easton Theatre, star Rita Vernon (Mary Duncan) breezes in to see the middle-aged theater owner and producer, Louis Easton (Adolphe Menjou), who is well aware of his prestige in the theater world. Rita is a diva, high-handed and self-absorbed, with an alcohol problem as well, but she's under verbal contract to Easton. She shamelessly flirts as she negotiates a deal; she'll accept a small role (which she doesn't want) in the upcoming play, for one big concession: her pick of roles in the next production. The principals are taking a risk that she'll contain her artistic temperament and lay off the bottle. Even so, her name and fame will help launch the play, a new comedy by Joseph Sheridan (Douglas Fairbanks Jr.)

Meanwhile, Eva meets and impresses Robert Hedges (C. Aubrey Smith), an experienced character actor also under contract to Easton. Delighted with her childlike ebullience, Hedges agrees to help her. He takes Eva into the office and introduces her as his protegee.  Sheridan, there to cast his upcoming comedy production, is also immediately struck by Eva's vivacious and eccentric personality, A non-stop talker, Eva bubbles over with intensity about her small-town New England background and her belief in non-conformity and self-realization. She declares that after a long and successful career, she'll kill herself onstage as a dramatic farewell to her fans. Sheridan is entranced, but Easton is not. 

Months pass. Hedges has lost touch with Eva. She frequently moves due to poor finances and hasn't been cast in meaningful roles. Hedges finds her struggling and hungry. Eva expresses regret that Easton gave her a small role in one of his lesser plays, which flopped. She bravely declares she won't take any more offers, unless the role truly suits her abilities. Realizing her situation, Hodges escorts her to a celebrity party at Easton's apartment. Eva quickly downs two glasses of champagne on an empty stomach. Inebriated, Eva sits on the arm of Easton's chair, stroking his face and vowing to prove her dramatic talents to him. She makes a spectacle of herself before the bemused party guests. Then unexpectedly she gives two Shakespearean orations, Hamlet's well-known monologue ("to be or not to be") followed by Juliet's balcony scene. The difference in the roles demonstrates her art; she gets a polite ovation from the guests and further impresses Sheridan. She lays her head on Easton's lap and promptly falls asleep. His butler put her to bed in his own bedroom.

The next morning, Easton asks Sheridan for help. Easton gave in to temptation and explains the encounter through innuendo. He's remorseful at taking advantage of a girl's innocence and can't face her. Sheridan is devastated to learn the overnight guest was Eva. Easton apologizes and leaves. A radiant Eva comes downstairs and sees Sheridan whom she regards as "just a friend". Happily, she tells him everything. To her, the night with Easton is the beginning of a long commitment. Sheridan can't bring himself to break her heart. He lets her leave without explaining.

More months pass. Eva has tried numerous times to see Easton. Unwilling to face her, Easton has simply ignored her. Sheridan keeps his own love a secret. Easton's theater company is ready to showcase Sheridan's new dramatic masterpiece. The play will star Rita Vernon. Sheridan approves of her performance in rehearsals. Backstage on opening night, Rita calls Easton into her dressing room. Heretofore she and Easton have had only verbal agreements. Aware of the power she holds at this late hour, Rita now has demands. She wants a written contract with a huge salary increase and half the profits from the entire run of the play. Easton thinks he has no choice but to comply. Sheridan draws him and urges him to let Rita go. Instead, they can bring in a special understudy, one he's kept secret until now -- Eva Lovelace. Easton reluctantly agrees and Rita storms off the set.

Eva and Joseph end up together in the star's dressing room. Faced with this sudden opportunity, Eva seems overcome with doubt and fear. She can't perform with Easton in the audience; they haven't spoken since their night together. She feels unsure of her talents and feels doomed to failure.  Sheridan reassures her that she can handle whatever is thrown at her. She's strong and beautiful, a born actress who can now prove it. Eva rallies, gathers her self-confidence, and resolves to conquer the role.

As Sheridan predicted, Eva is a complete success. Backstage, Easton reconciles with Eva, offering her his professional friendship and aid. When he goes, Sheridan gathers the courage to declare his love for Eva. She hushes him and makes no requitement. Now she's there with only her dresser, an elegant elderly lady who was herself once a brief star or "morning glory". The dresser comforts Eva, assuring her that she has the talent to succeed in show business and life; but really only one thing matters, true love. She knows that because she once spurned the love she was offered, choosing fame instead, at the beginning of her all too brief career. Renewed, Eva readies herself to forge down the rocky road to stardom ahead of her. The film ends with some uncertainty, but on an upbeat note. Once again self-confident, dramatic to the heart, Eva declares to her dresser, "I'm not afraid...to be a morning glory. I am not afraid!"

Main cast

Katharine Hepburn as Eva Lovelace 
Douglas Fairbanks Jr. as Joseph Sheridan 
Adolphe Menjou as Louis Easton
Mary Duncan as Rita Vernon
C. Aubrey Smith as Robert Harley "Bob" Hedges
Don Alvarado as Pepi Velez
Fredric Santley as Will Seymour, Easton's assistant
Richard Carle as Henry Lawrence, theatrical critic
Tyler Brooke as Charley Van Duesen
Geneva Mitchell as Gwendoline Hall
Helen Ware as Nellie Navarre, dresser (wardrobe woman) and herself a former star

Production
In pre-production, the script had been tailored to fit the talents of Constance Bennett, then RKO's biggest attraction. However, when newcomer Katharine Hepburn read the script, she convinced producer Pandro S. Berman that she was born to play the part, and she was given the role over the more popular Bennett, who was thereupon reassigned to Bed of Roses (1933).

When RKO bought the rights to the play from Zoë Akins, it still hadn't been produced on stage. It eventually saw a limited stage run in 1939. The director Lowell Sherman managed to get the RKO bosses to agree that he was given a week of rehearsal with the actors before the shooting began, in return for promising a shooting schedule of only 18 days (April 21 - May 12, 1933). Unlike most feature films, Morning Glory was shot in the same sequence as the script. Katharine Hepburn was paid $2,500 per week for her work on the picture, for which she eventually won her first Academy Award for Best Actress.

Box office
After cinema circuits deducted their exhibition share of box office tickets, this film earned a  profit of $115,000.

Radio adaptations
On September 19, 1938 Lux Radio Theatre broadcast a one-hour radio adaptation of the film, starring Barbara Stanwyck, Melvyn Douglas and Ralph Bellamy. On October 12, 1942 a second Lux Radio Theatre adaptation was aired, this time starring Judy Garland as Eva Lovelace, with Adolphe Menjou reprising his role of Louis Easton. Garland performed the song "I'll Remember April" on the broadcast.

On April 7, 1949 a half-hour radio adaptation was aired on Hallmark Playhouse with Elizabeth Taylor in the lead role of Eva Lovelace.

References

External links
 

1933 films
1933 drama films
American black-and-white films
American drama films
Films scored by Max Steiner
Films about actors
Films about theatre
American films based on plays
Films directed by Lowell Sherman
Films featuring a Best Actress Academy Award-winning performance
Films set in New York City
RKO Pictures films
Films adapted into radio programs
1930s English-language films
1930s American films